Vadim Yuryevich Logunov (2 March 1968 – 12 May 2021) was a Russian footballer who played as a forward or midfielder.

References

1968 births
2021 deaths
Sportspeople from Lipetsk
Soviet footballers
Russian footballers
Association football forwards
Association football midfielders
Russian Premier League players
FC Metallurg Lipetsk players
FC APK Morozovsk players
FC Krystal Kherson players
FC Lokomotiv Nizhny Novgorod players
Russian expatriate footballers
Expatriate footballers in Ukraine